Rosenbloom may refer to:

People
Benjamin L. Rosenbloom, American politician
Bert Rosenbloom, American economist and author
Chip Rosenbloom, American filmmaker
Carroll Rosenbloom, American businessman
David Rosenbloom, film and television editor
David H. Rosenbloom, scholar
Kate R. Rosenbloom, software engineer
Maxie Rosenbloom, American boxer
Paul C. Rosenbloom, American mathematician

Other uses
Skipalong Rosenbloom, an American film
"Cortège for Rosenbloom", a poem
Rosenbloom v. Metromedia, 1971 Supreme Court case

See also
 Rosenblum, a surname